

550001–550100 

|-bgcolor=#f2f2f2
| colspan=4 align=center | 
|}

550101–550200 

|-bgcolor=#f2f2f2
| colspan=4 align=center | 
|}

550201–550300 

|-bgcolor=#f2f2f2
| colspan=4 align=center | 
|}

550301–550400 

|-bgcolor=#f2f2f2
| colspan=4 align=center | 
|}

550401–550500 

|-bgcolor=#f2f2f2
| colspan=4 align=center | 
|}

550501–550600 

|-id=525
| 550525 Sigourneyweaver || 2012 NL || Sigourney Weaver (born 1949), an American actress who is best-known for her lead role as "Ripley" in the Alien franchise. || 
|}

550601–550700 

|-bgcolor=#f2f2f2
| colspan=4 align=center | 
|}

550701–550800 

|-bgcolor=#f2f2f2
| colspan=4 align=center | 
|}

550801–550900 

|-bgcolor=#f2f2f2
| colspan=4 align=center | 
|}

550901–551000 

|-bgcolor=#f2f2f2
| colspan=4 align=center | 
|}

References 

550001-551000